The 1972 Appalachian State Mountaineers football team was an American football team that represented Appalachian State University as a member of the Southern Conference (SoCon) during the 1972 NCAA University Division football season. In their second year under head coach Jim Brakefield, the Mountaineers compiled an overall record of 5–5–1 with a mark of 0–3–1 in conference play, and finished eighth in the SoCon.

Schedule

References

Appalachian State
Appalachian State Mountaineers football seasons
Appalachian State Mountaineers football